Kalle Heikkinen (20 February 1908 – 15 December 1938) was a Finnish cross-country skier. He competed in the men's 50 kilometre event at the 1936 Winter Olympics.

Cross-country skiing results

Olympic Games

World Championships

References

External links
 

1908 births
1938 deaths
Finnish male cross-country skiers
Olympic cross-country skiers of Finland
Cross-country skiers at the 1936 Winter Olympics
People from Paltamo
Sportspeople from Kainuu
20th-century Finnish people